"Comfort items" is the term used at the American prison for secret detainees in the US naval base at Guantanamo Bay, Cuba.  Psychological experts suggested that the withdrawal of toiletries and other basic items of personal hygiene could be used to discipline the detainees without being blamed for overt cruelty.

Muslims are obliged to pray five times a day.  But they must bathe, so they are ritually clean, first.  The withdrawal of toiletries interferes with their prayers.

Good behavior is rewarded with an increase in comfort items such as fast food or additional reading material.  Detainees can also receive a white two-piece outfit that is closer to traditional wear for men in most Islamic countries.

References

Guantanamo Bay captives legal and administrative procedures